Muhsin Muhammad II (born Melvin Darnell Campbell Jr. May 5, 1973) is an American former professional football player who was a wide receiver for the Carolina Panthers and Chicago Bears of the National Football League (NFL).  Muhammad played college football for Michigan State. He was drafted by the Panthers in the second round of the 1996 NFL Draft. Muhammad was a two-time Pro Bowl selection for the Panthers in 1999 and 2004 and also made the 2004 All-Pro Team. He was known for his nickname, "Moose," and for his signature mustache, and touchdown dance, which was featured in one of the opening cameos of Madden NFL 2006.

Early life
Muhammad was born in Lansing, Michigan. His birth name was Melvin Campbell, but it was changed after his father converted to Islam when Muhammad was four years old.

Muhammad was mainly a soccer player in elementary school, but peer pressure led him to play football. He attended Waverly High School in Lansing, Michigan, where he earned three letters in football and an additional two in basketball and track. Muhammad was also an all-state linebacker and  running back at Waverly.

After graduating from high school, Muhammad played at Michigan State University. He enjoyed a breakout season in 1995 under coach Nick Saban with 50 catches for 867 yards and 3 touchdowns while playing with quarterback Tony Banks and wide receiver Derrick Mason.

Professional career

Carolina Panthers (1996–2004)
The Carolina Panthers selected Muhammad in the 1996 NFL Draft's second round with the 43rd overall pick. After two mediocre seasons, Muhammad earned a starting role in 1998 and led the Panthers with 68 receptions, six touchdowns, and almost 1,000 yards.

Muhammad enjoyed an outstanding season in 1999 under new head coach George Seifert and his 96 receptions, eight touchdowns, and 1,253 receiving yards led to his first Pro Bowl selection. His 102 receptions during the 2000 season tied for the NFL lead. Muhammad averaged over 1,000 yards each season from 1998 to 2000.

Muhammad was injured for much of the 2001 NFL season, but he returned to form and eventually played a leading role in the Carolina Panthers' run to Super Bowl XXXVIII during 2003 NFL season. Though the Panthers lost to the AFC Champion New England Patriots 29–32, Muhammad recorded the longest touchdown reception (85 yards) in Super Bowl history.

Muhammad's play during the 2004 season, where he led the NFL with a career-high 1,405 receiving yards and 16 receiving touchdowns, earned him his second Pro Bowl invitation. By the end of the season, Muhammad held all of the Panthers' receiving records, including catches (578), receiving yards (7,751), 100-yard games (26), and the top three single-game yardage totals (192, 189, 179). In addition, he tied Wesley Walls at 44 touchdown receptions.

Muhammad, who was due a $10 million roster bonus, and the Panthers could not agree on a contract after the 2004 season, and the team released him in February 2005. Hours after his release, the Chicago Bears offered the 32-year-old a six-year contract, and Muhammad left Charlotte for Chicago.

Muhammad's first stint with the Panthers was plagued with several negative experiences. He was the target of a racial slur from his quarterback, Kerry Collins; testified at murder hearings for Rae Carruth and Deidra Lane (wife of Fred Lane); and was arrested in 2003 on misdemeanor drug and weapon offenses.

Chicago Bears (2005–2007)
Muhammad became one of the Bears' receiving threats during his first year with the team. He was also credited with encouraging a stronger work ethic within the team's receiving corps and advising young wide receivers such as Bernard Berrian, Mark Bradley, and Rashied Davis.

Despite failing to catch several poorly thrown passes from rookie quarterback Kyle Orton, Muhammad held himself responsible and promised reporters he would improve his performance. However, Muhammad was later seen complaining to Orton during a Sunday Night Football game against the Atlanta Falcons. After Muhammad's criticism, coach Lovie Smith benched Orton in favor of a fully recovered Rex Grossman.

Muhammad's statistics improved with Rex Grossman at quarterback in the 2006 season. He had his first one hundred-yard day with the Bears in their season opener against the Green Bay Packers, and a second against the Minnesota Vikings during Week 3. However, he saw less action as Grossman began to play inconsistently after the season's midway point. Muhammad defended Grossman from criticism and often supported him at press conferences. Muhammad finished the regular season as the team's leading wide receiver for the second consecutive time.

Muhammad was also the starting receiver for the bears in Super Bowl XLI, making a touchdown reception in the first half of a 29-17 loss to the Indianapolis colts. 

Muhammad's age seemingly affected his endurance. Although he played all sixteen games in 2006, the Bears listed him as probable or questionable before many games. Before the 2006 season, he revealed he had played through the 2005 season with a broken hand.

Muhammad had a down year in 2007, and the Bears released him on February 18, 2008.

After leaving the Bears, Muhammad told Sports Illustrated Chicago is "where wide receivers go to die." The remark caught the attention of Darryl Drake, the team's wide receiver coach. While Drake stated he was unfazed by Muhammad's remark, he argued former Bears wide receivers Bernard Berrian, Justin Gage, and Bobby Wade developed in Chicago and enjoyed successful careers after leaving.

Return to Carolina (2008–2009)
Just nine days after the Bears released him, Muhammad signed a two-year contract with his former team, the Carolina Panthers. On September 14, while playing against the Bears, he became the 29th player in NFL history to reach 10,000 career receiving yards. He finished the season with 65 receptions for 923 yards and five touchdowns.

In the 2009 season, Muhammad caught 53 passes for 581 yards and a touchdown. After 14 seasons in the NFL, he retired from professional football.

NFL career statistics

Regular season

Postseason

Franchise records 
's NFL off-season, Muhammad held at least six Panthers franchise records, including:
 Yds/Rec: playoffs (20.35), playoff game (35 on 2004-02-01 NNWE), rookie season (16.28 in 1996)
 Receiving TDs: season (16 in 2004), game (3 on 1999-12-18 SFO and 2004-11-14 @SFO; with Steve Smith Sr. x2)
 Games with 2+ touchdowns scored: season (5 in 2004; with Steve Smith Sr. and DeAngelo Williams)

Broadcasting career
During the 2002 and  2003 off-season, Muhammad became a color commentator for NFL Europe on behalf of Fox television. He also was a post-season correspondent for NFL Network in 2004 and has worked as a color commentator for the Big Ten Network

Muhammad won a Chicago Emmy Award for Outstanding Achievement for Sports Programs for his segment, Hanging with the Moose, which aired on Comcast SportsNet's "SportsNite" in 2005.

Personal life
Despite his father's conversion to Islam, Muhammad is a Christian. He is married to Christa Muhammad. The couple have four daughters and two sons: (oldest to youngest) Jordan, Chase, Journey, Muhsin III, Maddon, and Kennedy. The family adopted Maddon and Journey from Ethiopia in 2007.  Jordan is a member of the women's basketball team at Princeton University. Chase is a member of the women's basketball team at Johnson & Wales University Charlotte. Muhsin III is a member of the Texas A&M football team. Maddon is a member of the UNC Charlotte Track and Field team.

He works as a managing director at the private equity firm Axum Capital Partners, a firm he co-founded.

Philanthropy
Muhammad's charity foundation, "The M2 Foundation for Kids", is dedicated to improving the mental and physical development of children. He also supports the "Back to Nature" program which encourages children to spend more time with nature by taking them on hikes throughout the Great Smoky Mountains and nature preserves in Tennessee and the Muscular Dystrophy Association in Charlotte, North Carolina, where he raised funds and awareness for the group by helping organize Christmas toy drives and a special football camp. Muhammad is also a spokesperson for the Men For Change organization which helps raise money for impoverished women's shelters.

On February 28, 2007, Muhammad's high school alma mater gave him a special award for donating $50,000 worth of equipment to school's fitness center, which was renamed in his honor.

The Carolina Panthers presented Muhammad with their "Man of the Year" award in 1999 for his charity and volunteer work.

References

External links 
 Moose87.com - Official Website
 Muhammad @ NFL Rush: Player of the Day
Carolina Panthers bio

1973 births
African-American Christians
African-American players of American football
American football wide receivers
American former Muslims
Carolina Panthers players
American commentators
Chicago Bears players
Converts to Christianity
Converts to Protestantism from Islam
Living people
Michigan State Spartans football players
National Conference Pro Bowl players
Players of American football from Michigan
Sportspeople from Lansing, Michigan
21st-century African-American sportspeople
20th-century African-American sportspeople
10,000 receiving yards club
Ed Block Courage Award recipients